Bridgewater station is an MBTA Commuter Rail station in Bridgewater, Massachusetts on the Middleborough/Lakeville Line. It is located on the east end of the Bridgewater State University campus along the Middleborough Main Line.

History

The Fall River Railroad opened through Bridgewater in 1846. The former Bridgewater station, designed by New York architect Bradford Gilbert, is located in Bridgewater proper, is now a Burger King restaurant. It served as a train station until 1959, then again from 1984 to 1988 as a stop on the Cape Cod & Hyannis Railroad.

The modern station opened on September 29, 1997, along with the rest of the Middleborough/Lakeville and Plymouth/Kingston Lines.

References

External links

MBTA - Bridgewater

Stations along Old Colony Railroad lines
MBTA Commuter Rail stations in Plymouth County, Massachusetts
Bridgewater State University
Bridgewater, Massachusetts
Railway stations in the United States opened in 1997